The Golden Swing is a series of four tennis tournaments that are part of the Association of Tennis Professionals (ATP) tour, held every February in Latin America. The four tournaments have been termed the ‘Golden Swing’ in honour of Chilean Olympic gold medalists Nicolas Massú and Fernando González.

The series began in 2001, linking four tournaments in Latin America: Viña del Mar (Chile), Buenos Aires (Argentina), Costa do Sauípe (Brazil) and Acapulco (Mexico).

Since the series started in 2001, no player has won more than two titles in one year.

Tournaments
In 2010, the Chile Open was moved from Viña del Mar to Santiago. However, the tournament returned to Viña de Mar only two years later. In 2015, the tournament was bought by investors in Colombia, and moved to Quito, Ecuador. The Ecuador Open's last event was 2018, after which it ceased due to lack of funding, and moved to Córdoba, Argentina.

In 2012, the Brasil Open was moved from Costa do Sauípe to São Paulo and transitioned from outdoors to indoors.

Starting in 2014, the Mexican Open switched from clay to hard courts, serving as a lead-up to the first ATP World Tour Masters 1000 event of the season in Indian Wells, United States. The same year, Brazilian investors purchased the ATP 500 level tournament from Memphis which was played on indoor hard courts. They moved it to Rio de Janeiro as the new anchor tournament of the Golden Swing.

Tournaments as of 2020

Former Golden Swing tournaments
The Ecuador Open and Brasil Open have been disbanded while the Mexican Open has rebranded itself as a lead-up tournament to the Indian Wells and Miami Masters.

Champions by year
Win number out of total wins are shown in parentheses for players with more than one Golden Swing title since the series started in 2001. Purple shading indicates the tournament was played on hard courts.

Multiple winners

References 

ATP Tour